Cipher Bureau may refer to:

 Cipher Bureau (United States), aka Black Chamber (1919–1929), the US government's first peacetime cryptanalytic organization
 Cipher Bureau (Poland) (Biuro Szyfrów), the interwar Polish unit charged with signals intelligence, cryptography and cryptanalysis that broke the German cipher machine Enigma
 Cipher Bureau (film), a 1938 American film